Gabara obscura is a species of moth in the family Erebidae. It is found in North America.

The MONA or Hodges number for Gabara obscura is 8518.

References

Further reading

 
 
 

Scolecocampinae
Articles created by Qbugbot
Moths described in 1883